Sony YAY! is an Indian pay television channel aimed at children, operated by Culver Max Entertainment. The channel created for age groups between 6 and 14. The channel primarily airs foreign animated series and some animes in native languages.

History 

The channel was launched on 18 April 2017, Sony Pictures Networks announced their plans to migrate all Indian animated programming broadcast on the channel as paid content to its digital platform Sony LIV.

Sony YAY! launched Taarak Mehta Kka Chhota Chashmah, an animated show based on the Hindi sitcom Taarak Mehta Ka Ooltah Chashmah on 19 April 2021.

On 7 June 2021, the channel started airing Bernard with the title Bhaalu Ye Bindass Hai.

Ding Dong Bell Masti Ka Khel premiered on Sony YAY! on 16 August 2021. The second season of Taarak Mehta Kka Chhota Chashmah also aired on same date.

The French animated series Oggy and the Cockroaches started airing on the channel from 11 October 2021. In 2021, the channel only aired season 4 and season 3 (remake) of the series. With this, a feature film of the series i.e. Oggy and the Cockroaches: The Movie was also premiered on 25 October 2021 on the channel. The series airs with Indian dialogues and commentary by Mubeen Saudagar who voices all characters in Hindi version.

The channel launched the British animated series Horrid Henry in November 2021 with the title Haste Raho Henry.

Season 6 and 7 of Oggy and the Cockroaches aired on the channel in 2022.

Sony YAY! also launched Harry & Bunnie in February 2022 with a different title Rabbit Aur Bhalla Fun Hoga Khullam Khulla.

The third season of Taarak Mehta Kka Chhota Chashmah came out on 16 May 2022. With this, a tele movie (45-minute-long episode) titled Tapu and the Big Fat Alien Wedding was also premiered on 27 May 2022.

Sony YAY! started airing the anime series Robotan and a new show HaGoLa on 20 June 2022.

On 1 July 2022, Sony YAY! was launched in Malaysia in Tamil language on Telekom Malaysia with a total of seven popular kid's entertainment shows including Sab Jholmaal Hai, Guru Aur Bhole, Taarak Mehta Ka Chhota Chashma, Kicko & Super Speedo, Paap-O-Meter, Prince Jai aur Dumdaar Viru and HaGoLa.

On 15 August 2022, the channel launched hit anime television series Naruto in five regional languages – Hindi, Tamil, Telugu, Malayalam and Bengali. The head of programming of Sony YAY!, Ronojoy Chakraborty told IGN India in an interview that the channel plans to bring more anime content to the country after Naruto.

In September 2022, the channel was launched in Canada through Asian Television Network.

On 19 September 2022, the channel launched one more French animated series The Owl & Co with a different name i.e. Dhakki Chiki Aaool!

On 24 October 2022, the channel launched Oggy and the Cockroaches: Next Generation a brand new season of Oggy and the Cockroaches on the occasion of Diwali. The fifth season of Oggy and the Cockroaches began to air on the channel from November 2022 in the occasion of Children's Day.

Sony YAY! launched a new original series PaJaMa from 5 December 2022. Mr. Magoo was also premiered in 26 December 2022 on the channel.

Programming

References

External links
 
 Official YouTube channel

2017 establishments in Maharashtra
Children's television channels in India
Television channels and stations established in 2017
Television stations in Mumbai
Sony Pictures Networks India
Indian animation
Hindi-language television channels in India
Sony Pictures Entertainment